{{Infobox officeholder
| name                = Robert Z. Barbers
| nickname            = Bobby
| image               = 
| office              = Senator of the Philippines
| office1             = 16th Secretary of the Interior and Local Government
| president1          = Fidel V. Ramos
| predecessor1        = Rafael Alunan III
| successor1          = Epimaco Velasco
| office2             = Member of the House of Representatives from Surigao del Norte's 2nd district
| predecessor2        = Constantino Navarro
| successor2          = Ace Barbers
| birth_name          = Robert Zabala Barbers
| birth_date          = 
| birth_place         = Surigao, Surigao, Commonwealth of the Philippines
| death_date          = 
| death_place         = Pasig, Philippines
| nationality         = 
| spouse              = Virginia Smith
| party               = Lakas–CMD
| relations           = 
| children            = with Smith:  4, including Aceout of wedlock: 4
| residence           = Surigao City
| alma_mater          = Silliman UniversityLyceum of the Philippines University (BA, LL.B)National Defense College of the Philippines (MS, MNSA)
| occupation          = Politician, police officer
| signature           = 
| website             = 
| footnotes           = 
| profession          = Lawyer
| honorific_prefix    = The Honourable
| resting_place       = Manila Memorial Park – Sucat
| termstart           = June 30, 1998
| termend             = June 30, 2004
| termstart1          = April 16, 1996
| termend1            = February 3, 1998
| termstart2          = June 30, 1992
| termend2            = April 15, 1996
}}
Robert Zabala Barbers (January 19, 1944 – December 25, 2005) was a police officer, Secretary of the Interior and Local Government and Senator of the Philippines.

Early life and studies
Barbers was born in the then-town of Surigao to Felix and Regina Barbers. His paternal grandfather, George Barbieri (later Barbers), was an Italian-American immigrant from the Spanish–American War who married a Surigaonon lady. He spoke Cebuano, Tagalog, English, and his native Surigaonon. Barbers studied at the Surigao Elementary School and finished in 1955. He graduated as valedictorian at Surigao High School in 1959. He studied Political Science at Silliman University but completed his degree in 1981 at the Lyceum of the Philippines University, where he also earned his Bachelor of Laws in 1985.

He later went on to earn degrees of Master of Science in Criminology and Master of Science in National Security Administration at the National Defense College in 1992 and 1994.

Police career
Barbers was encouraged by his uncle, police general and former Vice Mayor of Manila, James G. Barbers, who was then with the Philippine National Police – Western Police District, to join the police force. He was also influenced by his reading of various mystery novels. He passed the examinations for enlistment in the Manila Police Department. In 1975, he became a police sergeant and was assigned in some chartered cities. He was promoted to the rank of Police Officer II in 1981 and to Police Officer I in 1983. His highest rank achieved as a member of the Manila police force was colonel; however, he was also Chief of the National Bureau of Investigation (NBI)'s Police Special Task Force and Inspector of the National Police Commission.

Barbers served for 27 years in law enforcement. He participated in "the elimination of several notorious drug traffickers" while under the auspices of the NBI.

His list of accomplishments as a police officer include: adjudged for three consecutive years as one of the Ten Outstanding Policemen of the Philippines (TOPP) from 1986 to 1988; sixteen efficiency medals for solving major crimes; earned promotions for the arrest of drug lord Don "Jose Pepe" Oyson and rebel leaders Col. Billy Bibit and Ignacio Capegsan; awarded the medals of merit and gallantry and given commendations and letters from the U.S. State Department and various other embassies; and was the only Filipino Golden Service Awardee for Outstanding Law Enforcer in Asia, which was awarded in New York in 1991.

Congressman
Barbers entered the political arena in 1992 as a member of the House of Representatives representing the 2nd District of Surigao del Norte. He was recognized and acclaimed for his outstanding performance as a legislator by various institutions and organizations, including the Consumer Welfare Foundation of the Philippines, University of the Philippines, Gladiator Magazine, Pilipino Newsline, the Consumer's Union of the Philippines (PICC) and the National Defense College of the Philippines. The Mindanao congressman was re-elected in 1995 unopposed.

Secretary of Interior and Local Government
During Barbers's second term, he was appointed by President Fidel Ramos as Secretary of the Department of the Interior and Local Government in 1996.

As a member of the Cabinet, Barbers remained active in his campaign against criminality with his founding of the Public Assistance and Reaction Against Crime (PARAC). It was during his stint as Interior Chief that he intensified his campaign against illegal drugs. He established the Bring-A-Friend Project, which worked for the voluntary submission of drug dependents for rehabilitation. It was also during his tenure as Interior and Local Government Secretary when he founded the Barangay at Pulisya Laban sa Krimen (BPLK) Program whose main purpose was to enlist the cooperation and active participation of the civilian population in the fight against criminality.

Barbers was named by the Social Weather Station (SWS) survey as the most effective, most efficient, and most popular Cabinet member of the Ramos administration five consecutive times.

Senator
Barbers was encouraged by Ramos to run in the 1998 elections as a Senator under the Lakas NUCD Party. During the campaign, Barbers was deemed as one of the "sure win" candidates for the Senate. The Mindanao congressman ranked fifth among the elected Senators in terms of votes received, and became the first police officer who became a member of the Philippine Senate. (Panfilo "Ping" Lacson, another law enforcement official who was Director General and head of the Presidential Anti Organized Crime Task Force or PAOCT-F, later became a Senator as well, in 2001–2002.)

As chairman of the Senate Committee on Public Order and Illegal Drugs, Barbers continued to focus on fighting criminality, injustice, and illegal drugs, which he considered as the number one enemy of the people. He authored more than a hundred bills and resolutions, the majority of which were aimed at improving the peace and order situation and uplifting the living conditions of Filipinos. Barbers also drafted an anti-terrorism bill as a Senator.

In November 2000, Barbers was diagnosed with a throat problem and was later flown to the United States. He was the lone senator absent during the impeachment trial of President Joseph Estrada. When he returned to the Philippines in February 2001, the impeachment trial was over and Estrada was ousted by the second EDSA People Power Revolution.

After the 2001 elections, Barbers authored the law creating the Philippine Drug Enforcement Agency. He was instrumental in the crafting of other laws that increased penalties for "jueteng" protectors and operators and strengthened the anti-drugs campaign, such as including possession of 10 grams of methamphetamine hydrochloride as a nonbailable offense.

Barbers was a strong advocate of the death penalty for capital offenders.

2004 elections
In the 2004 elections, Barbers ran for reelection as senator under the Lakas CMD banner, but lost.

He filed an election protest against Senator Rodolfo Biazon to contest the 12th slot, accusing the Commission on Elections of haste in proclaiming the latter's victory and demanding that the poll body await the election results in his strongholds in Mindanao. His petition was eventually denied.

Barbers's name was also mentioned in the controversial "Hello Garci" tapes. Transcripts of the tapes showed Barbers calling then Election Commissioner Virgilio Garcillano to ensure his victory in the 2004 elections.

Personal life
Bobby, as Barbers was known to many, was married to Virginia Smith. They had four children, three of whom are sons also named Robert. Robert "Ace" Barbers is the representative of the 2nd district of Surigao del Norte who previously served as governor the same province. Robert Dean Barbers was the Director of the Philippine Tourism Authority and was once a city councilor of Makati. Robert Lyndon Barbers was also a Provincial Governor of Surigao del Norte.{{Citation needed|date=August 2017}.

Barbers was a pious devotee of the Santo Niño, as evidenced by the various icons of the child Christ which adorned his office. He credited the Santo Niño for every success, including the criminal cases he had solved and all his electoral victories. Because of his devotion to the child Christ, and for being a law enforcer, Barbers came up with a Santo Niño image dressed in police uniform, which came to be known as the Sto. Niño de Policia.

Barbers was twice considered for the position of vice president in the ticket of then presidential candidate de Venecia in 1998, and again in 2004 after Arroyo considered him following her ascension to the presidency after the ouster of Joseph Estrada.

His life was put into film starring Phillip Salvador, Willie Revillame, Herbert Bautista, John Regala and Jeffrey Santos.

Death
Barbers died at 10:29 a.m., on Christmas Day, 2005, at The Medical City Hospital in Pasig; although he had throat cancer, the cause of death was heart failure. He was buried at the Manila Memorial Park – Sucat in Parañaque.

In popular culture
Portrayed by Phillip Salvador in the 1997 film Bobby Barbers: Parak''.

References

External links
 Barbers at war
 Senate of the Philippines
 Demise of Ex-Sen. Barbers News Article

1944 births
2005 deaths
Deaths from cancer in the Philippines
Deaths from esophageal cancer
Filipino people of American descent
Filipino police officers
Visayan people
People from Surigao City
20th-century Filipino lawyers
Filipino Roman Catholics
Senators of the 12th Congress of the Philippines
Senators of the 11th Congress of the Philippines
Members of the House of Representatives of the Philippines from Surigao del Norte
Secretaries of the Interior and Local Government of the Philippines
Lyceum of the Philippines University alumni
Filipino people of Italian descent
Burials at the Manila Memorial Park – Sucat
Ramos administration cabinet members
Silliman University alumni